Altıntop is a surname, and may refer to:

Halil Altıntop, Turkish football player
Hamit Altıntop, Turkish football player

See also
Altıntop (town), A town in Turkey 

Turkish-language surnames